The Xihan or Western Han River (Chinese: trad. , simp. , Xīhànshuǐ) is a northern tributary of the Jialing River, itself a tributary of the Yangtze. Within China, it is also known as the "Rhinoceros River" (Xīniújiāng).

The "Western" in its name distinguishes this river from the Han River, today known in Chinese as the Hanjiang but historically known as the Hanshui.

See also
 Han River

Rivers of China
Yangtze River